Earl Eugene Corum (May 29, 1921 – January 2, 2010) was an American football player and coach. He served as the head football coach at West Virginia University from 1960 to 1965, compiling a record of 29–30–2. Corum played college football as a guard at West Virginia in the 1940s and graduated in 1948. He began his coaching career at Point Marion High School in Point Marion, Pennsylvania for two seasons before returning to West Virginia as an assistant coach in 1950.

Corum was inducted into the West Virginia University Sports Hall of Fame in 1984. He died on January 2, 2010, in Frederick, Maryland.

Head coaching record

College

References

1921 births
2010 deaths
American football guards
West Virginia Mountaineers football coaches
West Virginia Mountaineers football players
High school football coaches in Pennsylvania
Sportspeople from Huntington, West Virginia
Coaches of American football from West Virginia
Players of American football from West Virginia